Girondins de Bordeaux won Division 1 season 1986/1987 of the French Association Football League with 53 points.

Participating teams

Auxerre
Bordeaux
Stade Brest
Stade Lavallois
Le Havre AC
RC Lens
Lille
Olympique Marseille
FC Metz
AS Monaco
AS Nancy
FC Nantes Atlantique
OGC Nice
RC Paris
Paris Saint-Germain FC
Stade Rennais
AS Saint-Etienne
FC Sochaux
Sporting Toulon Var
Toulouse FC

League table

Promoted from Division 2, who will play in Division 1 season 1987/1988
 Montpellier HSC:Champion of Division 2, winner of Division 2 group B
 Chamois Niortais:Runner-up, winner of Division 2 group A
 AS Cannes:Third place, winner of barrages against FC Sochaux

Results

Relegation play-offs

|}

Top goalscorers

References

 Division 1 season 1986-1987 at pari-et-gagne.com

Ligue 1 seasons
France
1